The 2016 Asian Women's Volleyball Cup, so-called 2016 AVC Cup for Women was the fifth edition of the Asian Cup, a biennial international volleyball tournament organised by the Asian Volleyball Confederation (AVC) with Volleyball Federation of Vietnam (VFV). The tournament was held in the Vinh Yen Gymnasium in the Vĩnh Phúc Province, Vietnam from 14 to 20 September 2016.

Pools composition 
The teams are seeded based on their final ranking at the 2015 Asian Women's Volleyball Championship by serpentine system. The hosts which ranked fifth has the right to seed in top position of pool A. The number in brackets show the ranking of 2015 Asian Women's Volleyball Championship.

Squads

Preliminary round 
All times are Indochina Time (UTC+07:00).

Pool A 

|}

|}

Pool B 

|}

|}

Final round 
All times are Indochina Time (UTC+07:00).

Quarterfinals 

|}

5th–8th semifinals 

|}

Semifinals 

|}

7th place 

|}

5th place 

|}

3rd place 

|}

Final 

|}

Final standing

Awards

MVP:
 Li Jing
Best Setter:
 Irina Lukomskaya
Best Outside Spikers:
 Li Jing
 Ajcharaporn Kongyot

Best Middle Blockers:
 Kristina Anikonova
 Yang Zhou
Best Opposite Spiker:
 Yekaterina Zhdanova
Best Libero:
 Piyanut Pannoy

See also
2016 Asian Men's Volleyball Cup

References

External links
 Asian Volleyball Confederation

Asian Women's Volleyball Cup
2016 in women's volleyball
International volleyball competitions hosted by Vietnam
Vol
September 2016 sports events in Asia